East Central Independent School District is a public school district located in (as its name suggests) the eastern central portion of Bexar County, Texas (USA).  The district includes parts of San Antonio and China Grove.

In 2009, the school district was rated "academically acceptable" by the Texas Education Agency.

Schools
East Central High School
1995 Class AAAAA boys' basketball champions
Bexar County Learning Center
Heritage Middle School
Legacy Middle School
Oak Crest Intermediate School
Salado Intermediate School
Harmony Elementary School
Highland Forest Elementary School
Tradition Elementary School
Pecan Valley Elementary School
Sinclair Elementary School
Development Center
Learning academy

References

External links
East Central ISD

School districts in Bexar County, Texas
School districts in San Antonio